The Prelude in C Minor, BWV 999, is, according to its only extant 18th-century manuscript, a composition for lute by Johann Sebastian Bach. In the manuscript, conserved as Fascicle 19 of Mus.ms. Bach P 804 at the Berlin State Library, Johann Peter Kellner wrote the piece down in keyboard notation. The time of origin of the work is not known: possibly Bach composed it in his Köthen period, that is, between 1717 and 1723, or the early years of his ensuing Leipzig period. Kellner's copy was produced after 1727, but before Bach's death in 1750.

The Prelude can be performed as well on a lute as on a keyboard. In the 19th century, it was adopted as No. 3 in the keyboard collection Twelve Little Preludes. It was grouped with Bach's lute compositions in 20th-century scholarship such as the Bach-Jahrbuch of 1931, the Bach-Werke-Verzeichnis and the New Bach Edition. It has been recorded in performances on lute, on guitar, and on keyboard instruments such as piano or harpsichord. In the 21st century, digital facsimiles of Kellner's copy became available on-line, for instance at the Bach Digital website.

History 

According to the Bach Digital website, the time of origin of Johann Sebastian Bach's Prelude in C minor, BWV 999, is unknown. Christoph Wolff and Walter Emery estimated that the composition may have originated from Bach's Köthen period to the early years of his Leipzig period, which began in 1723, based on similarities with the Preludes and Fugues in The Well-Tempered Clavier.

According to Kohlhase, Johann Peter Kellner's copy of the Prelude dates from around the middle of the 1720s. A more comprehensive research into the time of origin of all 57 fascicles of the Berlin State Library's Mus.ms. Bach P 804 convolute, by Russell Stinson, showed that its 19th fascicle, Kellner's copy of the BWV 999 Prelude, originated after 1727. All fascicles of the P 804 manuscript were written before Bach's death in 1750. Kellner's manuscript is the only source for the composition.

The title page of Kellner's copy of BWV 999, page 101 in the D-B Mus.ms. Bach P 804 convolute, reads:The composition is written on the next two pages, on systems of two staffs, with a soprano clef for the upper staff, and a bass clef for the lower staff. Although, in the first half of the 18th century, a tablature notation was common for lute compositions, Kellner thus wrote the Prelude down in a notation which at the time was customary for keyboard compositions. The Prelude can be performed as well on a keyboard instrument as on a lute. Kellner is known as organist and keyboard performer: his copy of BWV 999 is the only extant instance of him taking an interest in a composition for lute.

A concluding section, which could follow after the Prelude as written down by Kellner, seems to be missing. The Prelude opens in C minor but instead of returning to that key (i.e., the tonic), it ends on the dominant, in fact the parallel key of the dominant, G major, while the closing chord contains a Picardy third.  compares this to the Prelude BWV 872a/1: after a section with arpeggios ending on the dominant, it continues with a fugato returning to the tonic. Whether Bach never composed such continuation of the piece, or whether Kellner didn't copy it, is not known.

Music 
BWV 999's brief, introductory nature (43 measures), improvisatory feel and reiteration of a defining motif fits squarely within the prelude genre of the 1710s and 1720s. Additionally, the shortness of the motif itself follows the conventions of early sixteenth-century prelude. It also served a teaching purpose characteristic of the genre, widely using arpeggiations and technical demands that served students well as an étude. Barbara Russano Hanning describes prelude features and goals: "The typical prelude assigns the player a specific task, so that the piece functions as an etude. In addition, the preludes illustrate different types of keyboard performance conventions and compositional practices." Such pedagogical traits contribute to the work's longevity; it is still an oft-used educational tool.

Motif 

The Prelude's central motif consists of intersecting rhythms between the upper and lower voice (what originally would have been the left and right hand). In the right hand, this is a sixteenth rest, followed by a seven-note sixteenth passage that typically arpeggiates an inversion of a triad (ascending and descending from and back to the root), and an alternating sixteenth rest–sixteenth note pattern in the third beat. The left participates by having a pedal tone quarter in the first beat, a rest, then two eighth notes.

Harmony 

Contrary to its title and key signature, less than a third of BWV 999 is actually written in C minor. In measure 11, a Secondary leading-tone chord is employed (namely, a diminished F seventh chord) to modulate and lead the ear to G minor, the dominant of the original key. Aside from a turn to G major (mm. 34–38 and 42–43), and the reemergence of C minor (mm. 39–41), G minor tonality dominates the piece. Early on, the upper voice is repeated over several measures, with the left hand providing the only shifting harmonic background. For example, measures 8–10 are exactly the same in the right hand, but descending tones in the left hand create an expansion of tonic harmony.

Reception 
In 1843, Friedrich Konrad Griepenkerl edited the Prelude as No. 3 of the "XII petits Préludes ou Exercises pour les Commençants", which was included in the 9th volume of Bach's complete keyboard works published by C. F. Peters. The next year, the publisher issued the Twelve Little Preludes set separately. Philipp Spitta described BWV 999 thus:Spitta, assuming that nearly none of Bach's compositions for lute survived, mentioned the third of the Twelve Little Preludes as composed for lute or keyboard. The Bach Gesellschaft retained the Twelve Little Preludes set for keyboard in the 36th volume, published in 1890, of their complete edition of Bach's works.

, writing in the Bach-Jahrbuch of 1931, had no doubt that Bach composed the Prelude for lute:Neemann identified five more compositions by Bach as intended for lute. In the Bach-Werke-Verzeichnis, first published in 1950, these compositions were grouped in the BWV 995–1000 range, in a section for lute works. The same six compositions were published in Series V, Vol. 10, of the New Bach Edition, in 1976.

The Prelude has been adapted for various instruments, including lute, piano and guitar. It is a pedagogical work much in the spirit of The Well-Tempered Clavier, with which it shares musical characteristics. In the second decade of the 21st century, digital facsimiles of Kellner's manuscript became available on the Berlin State Library and Bach Digital websites.

Recordings 
Some guitarists perform the Prelude BWV 999 in D minor instead of in its original key of C minor.

References

Sources

Further reading

External links
 
 Prelude in C minor BWV999 – recordings at Primephonic website.

Preludes by Johann Sebastian Bach
Articles containing video clips